Kitty's Amelia was Jeune Amélie launched in France in 1802. A British letter of marque captured her in 1803 and she became a Liverpool-based slave trader. Between 1804 and 1807 she made four slave-trading voyages but her chief claim to fame is that she performed the last legal slaving voyage for a British vessel. She was reported wrecked in 1809.

Career
In 1803 the letter of marque and slaver Kitty captured the French ship Jeune Amèlie as she was returning from the Indian Ocean with a cargo of sugar, indigo, spices, and muslin.

Kitty's Amelia entered Lloyd's Register in 1804 with Nuttall, master, and Thomas Clarke, owner.

Slave voyage #1 (1804)
Thomas Nuttall received a letter of marque on 17 January 1804. She sailed on 13 February. They were out only a few days when they encountered a French warship. Although they took some casualties, they were able to escape. Kitty's Amelia arrived at St Kitts on 3 July, with 286 slaves. She left St Kitts on 1 September and went on to Havana. She arrived at Liverpool on 10 October. Kitty's Amelia returned from Havana with a cargo of sugar, cowhides, and cotton. She had left Liverpool with 39 crew members and suffered five deaths on her voyage.

Slave voyage #2 (1804–1805)
Nuttall sailed on 3 December. She was in company with Thomas and Juno. Kitty's Amelia sailed to West Central Africa and St Helena. Having gathered her cargo of slaves at the Congo River. Kitty's Amelia sailed from Africa on 24 May 1805. She was bound for St Barts, at the time a Swedish colony. (The Swedes did not abolish the slave trade until 1813.) Near Saint Kitts crewmembers attempted a mutiny, a mutiny that Nuttall foiled. However, three mutineers managed to reach  and accused Nuttall of having engaged in transgressions relating to the transportation of slaves. she arrived at St Barts on 5 July and there landed 210 slaves, having embarked 288. The accusations against Nuttall forced him to remain in the Caribbean to answer the charges. Kitty's Amelias mate, Thomas Forest, sailed her back to Liverpool from St Barts with a cargo of sugar and cotton. She left on 19 August and arrived back at Liverpool on 9 November. She had left Liverpool with 49 crew members and suffered seven crew deaths on the voyage.

Slave voyage #3 (1806–1807)
Nuttall, having returned to Liverpool after having refuted the charges against him, resumed command of Kitty's Amelia. He sailed on 6 May 1806, bound for the Bight of Biafra and Gulf of Guinea islands.
Kitty's Amelia gathered her slaves at Bonny. Kitty's Amelia arrived in Barbados, and then sailed to Trinidad, having repulsed an attack by a French privateer. She arrived at Trinidad on 23 October and there landed 280 slaves. Nuttall was again forced to remain  in the Caribbean, and Forest again sailed her back to Liverpool. Her return cargo consisted of ivory, hides, palm oil, cotton, coffee, indigo, and sugar. She left for Liverpool on 17 February 1807, and arrived there on 20 April. She had left Liverpool with 42 crew members and lost four on the voyage.

Slave voyage #4 (1807–1808)
Kitty's Amelia underwent coppering and repairs in 1807. Then on 1 July 1807 Thomas Forrest received a letter of marque for Kitty's Amelia. The Act for the abolition of the slave trade had passed Parliament in March 1807 and took effect on 1 May 1807. However, Kitty's Amelia had received clearance to sail 27 April, before the deadline. Thus, when she sailed on 27 July, she did so legally. This was the last legal slave voyage for an English vessel. Kitty Amelias owners had appointed Forest as master, but that when Hugh Crow (or Crowe), returned to Liverpool on Mary they appointed Crow master and relegated Forest to chief mate. In his memoirs, Crow states that he commanded Kitty's Amelia from June 1807. Forrest resented his demotion and on the way to Bonny took every opportunity to undermine Crow's authority. Crow then relieved Forrest of his position. Forrest died on the coast of Africa. 

On 27 October 1807 five slavers, one of them Kitty's Amelia, left Bunce Island; they constituted the last legal convoy of British slavers. Because they were engaged in a legal voyage, they qualified for a British Royal Navy escort in the form of the 16-gun sloop , under the command of Lieutenant Frederick Hoffman (acting). The voyage to Barbados from Sierra Leone took seven weeks. Several times during the voyage Hoffman visited the slave ships under his care and found them orderly and clean, and the slaves healthy. Kitty's Amelia arrived with 233 slaves at Jamaica 25 January 1808.

In contrast with Hoffman's assessment of the state of health aboard the slave ships, Crow, in his memoir, recalled that Kitty's Amelia had lost 30 whites and 50 blacks to sickness on the voyage, the whites included her two doctors, who had died shortly after she arrived at Jamaica. He further noted that many of the other slavers that had hurried to beat the deadline for the end of the slave trade had lost twice as many blacks.

After loading a cargo for Liverpool, Crow decided to remain at Kingston to deal with some affairs. He entrusted the command of Kitty's Amelia to his friend Captain Thomas Brassey, who had sailed out on the schooner St George, which also belonged to Kitty's Amelias owners. Brassey left Jamaica 24 April 1808 and sailed to Liverpool with a cargo of beeswax, palm oil, elephants' teeth, Madeira wine, rum, sugar, and coffee, arriving on 30 June. He arrived at Liverpool on 29 June.

Then in 1808 Kitty's Amelias master became Roberts. She last appeared in Lloyd's Register in 1809 with Roberts, master, and trade Liverpool-The .

Fate
Lloyd's List reported that Kitty's Amelia had foundered in early February 1809 off Maldonado, Uruguay. She is no longer listed in the 1810 Lloyd's Register.

Notes, citations, and references
Notes

Citations

References
 
 
 

1802 ships
Ships built in France
Captured ships
Liverpool slave ships
Age of Sail merchant ships
Merchant ships of the United Kingdom
Maritime incidents in 1809
Shipwrecks in the Atlantic Ocean
Shipwrecks of Uruguay